Hans Schulze (25 August 1911 – 26 January 1992) was a German water polo player who competed in the 1932 Summer Olympics and in the 1936 Summer Olympics.

In 1932 he was part of the German team which won the silver medal. He played all four matches.

Four years later he won his second silver medal with the German team in Berlin. He played all seven matches.

See also
 List of Olympic medalists in water polo (men)

External links
 

1911 births
1992 deaths
German male water polo players
Olympic silver medalists for Germany
Olympic water polo players of Germany
Water polo players at the 1932 Summer Olympics
Water polo players at the 1936 Summer Olympics
Olympic medalists in water polo
Medalists at the 1936 Summer Olympics
Medalists at the 1932 Summer Olympics